The Bradshaw Lectures are prestigious lectureships given at the invitation of the Royal College of Physicians and the Royal College of Surgeons of England.

List of past lecturers at Royal College of Physicians

List of past lecturers at Royal College of Surgeons of England
The lecture is biennial (annual until 1993) on a topic in the field of surgery, customarily given by a senior member of the Council on or about the day preceding the second Thursday of December. (Given in alternate years, with the Hunterian Oration given in the intervening years).

References

British lecture series
Medical lecture series
Royal College of Physicians